Stellar Motel is a studio album by indie rock artist Mike Doughty. It was released in 2014.

Track listing
 Light Will Keep Your Heart Beating in the Future (3:15)
 When the Night Is Long (3:35)
 Oh My God Yeah Fuck It (feat. Moon Hooch and Miss Eaves) (3:14)
 Raging On (2:50)
 Let Me Lie (feat. Big Dipper) (3:02)
 These Are Your Friends (3:07)
 Let's Go to the Motherfucking Movies (3:19)
 The Champion (feat. MC Frontalot and Laura Lee Bishop) (3:57)
 Pretty Wild (feat. Ash Wednesday, Clara Bizna$$ and Uncle Meg from Hand Job Academy) (2:38)
 When You Come Home (2:40)
 走馬灯 (feat. Kim from Uhnellys) (1:32)
 Change (2:40)
 To See the Sun Come Down (feat. Jay Boogie and Andrew 'Scrap' Livingston) (3:31)
 The Brightness (3:20)
 In the Rising Sun (feat. Laura Lee Bishop) (3:32)
 Better Days Come Around (2:39)

External links
Official website

Mike Doughty albums
2014 albums